USA-183, also known as GPS IIR-14(M), GPS IIRM-1 and GPS SVN-53, is an American navigation satellite which forms part of the Global Positioning System. It was the first of eight Block IIRM satellites to be launched, and the fourteenth of twenty one Block IIR satellites overall. It was built by Lockheed Martin, using the AS-4000 satellite bus.

USA-183 was launched at 03:37:00 UTC on 26 September 2005, atop a Delta II carrier rocket, flight number D313, flying in the 7925-9.5 configuration. The launch took place from Space Launch Complex 17A at the Cape Canaveral Air Force Station, and placed USA-183 into a transfer orbit. The satellite raised itself into medium Earth orbit using a Star-37FM apogee motor.

It is used to broadcast the PRN 17 signal, and operates in slot 4 of plane C of the GPS constellation. As of 2019 it remains in service.

References

Spacecraft launched in 2005
GPS satellites
USA satellites